The Candler Street School, on Candler St. in Gainesville, Georgia, was built in 1911.  It was listed on the National Register of Historic Places in 1982.

It was designed by Cunningham Bros., architects, in Georgian Revival style.

It was built by Loden & Prater.  Master builder E.L. Prater (1872-1950) also built the NRHP-listed Walters-Davis House (1906), the NRHP-listed James B. Simmons House (1903), and the Stephens County Jail, all in Toccoa, Georgia, and a bank in Taylorsville, Georgia.

References

National Register of Historic Places in Hall County, Georgia
Buildings and structures completed in 1911
Georgian Revival architecture in Georgia (U.S. state)
Buildings and structures in Hall County, Georgia
Gainesville, Georgia